= Pipaliya Kunjadgarh =

Pipaliya Kunjadgarh Pipaliya Kunjadgarh
- village
- Location within Madhya Pradesh Location within India
- Coordinates: 23.138599°N 77.526467°E
- Country: India
- State: Madhya Pradesh
- District: Bhopal
- Tehsil: Huzur

Population (2011)
  - Total: 369
- Time zone: UTC+5:30 (IST)
- ISO 3166 code: MP-IN
- Census code: 482554

Pipaliya Kunjadgarh is a village in the Bhopal district of Madhya Pradesh, India. It is located in the Huzur tehsil and the Phanda block.

== Demographics ==
According to the 2011 census of India, Pipaliya Kunjadgarh has 66 households. The effective literacy rate (i.e. the literacy rate of population excluding children aged 6 and below) is 75.39%.

Demographics (2011 Census)
	Total	Male	Female
Population	369	178	191
Children aged below 6 years	52	25	27
Scheduled caste	85	40	45
Scheduled tribe	0	0	0
Literates	239	123	116
Workers (all)	51	35	16
Main workers (total)	30	23	7
Main workers: Cultivators	15	13	2
Main workers: Agricultural labourers	0	0	0
Main workers: Household industry workers	0	0	0
Main workers: Other	15	10	5
Marginal workers (total)	21	12	9
Marginal workers: Cultivators	4	3	1
Marginal workers: Agricultural labourers	0	0	0
Marginal workers: Household industry workers	2	1	1
Marginal workers: Others	15	8	7
Non-workers	318	143	175
